Cross is a village in the south of County Mayo, Ireland.

See also
 List of towns and villages in Ireland

References

Towns and villages in County Mayo